Pamela Redmond Satran (born April 10, 1953), now known as Pamela Redmond, is an American entrepreneur and author of fiction and nonfiction. Her novel Younger, published in 2005, is the basis for a TV series of the same name created by Darren Star and starring Sutton Foster and Hilary Duff. An expert on English personal naming, Satran is the CEO of the naming website Nameberry.

Life and career

Personal life and education 
Raised in Norwood, New Jersey, Satran attended the University of Wisconsin–Madison, where she was arts editor of The Daily Cardinal. After college, she moved to Brooklyn and worked as a fashion editor at Glamour magazine in New York and later as a fashion features editor.

Satran lived Montclair, New Jersey from the 1980s until 2015, when she moved to Los Angeles. In the 1990s Satran lived in Hampstead, London. While there, she coauthored books on naming in England and Ireland. In the late 1990s, Satran lived with her family in Berkeley, California, where she studied novel writing with Elizabeth George and Ann Packer.

Satran is divorced and is the mother of three children.

Naming books and related endeavors 
Satran left Glamour to co-author Beyond Jennifer & Jason (1988), a book analyzing style, image, and trends in personal naming, with Linda Rosenkrantz. The pair went on to write ten books on the subject, including The Baby Name Bible and Cool Names.

In 2008, seeing that information about names had migrated from books to the Internet, Satran and Rosenkrantz founded Nameberry, now the world's largest baby name website with a database of over 70,000 names, thematic naming lists, a daily blog, and forums for name searchers and enthusiasts.

Fiction 
Satran writes novels that explore women's lives and issues from a contemporary and historical perspective. Her first novel, The Man I Should Have Married, published in 2003, focuses on a woman retracing the decisions of her life and correcting her mistakes.

Her 2005 novel Younger, about a woman in her forties who pretends to be in her twenties to get an entry-level job, is the basis for a TV show of the same name. The show, which debuted on TVLand on March 31, 2015, stars Sutton Foster, Hilary Duff, Debi Mazar, and Miriam Shor.

Satran's 2012 novel, The Possibility of You, is inspired by the story of her Irish grandmother moving to the United States in the early 20th century and examines the lives of three women grappling with unplanned pregnancies at three key moments in U.S. history.

Bibliography

Novels
 The Man I Should Have Married (2003)
 Younger (2005)
 Suburbanistas (2006)
 The Home for Wayward Supermodels (2007)
 Babes in Captivity (2010)
 The Possibility of You (2012)
 Older (2020)

Humor books
 1000 Ways to be a Slightly Better Woman (2008)
 How Not to Act Old (2009)
 Rabid: Are You Crazy About Your Dog or Just Crazy? (2012)

Name books (with Linda Rosenkrantz)
 Beyond Jennifer & Jason (2006)
 Cool Names for Babies (2008)
 The Baby Name Bible (2011)

Other nonfiction
 Dressing Smart (1990)
 30 Things Every Woman Should Have & Should Know by the Time She’s 30 (2012)

References 

Living people
21st-century American novelists
American women novelists
21st-century American women writers
People from Montclair, New Jersey
Place of birth missing (living people)
People from Norwood, New Jersey
University of Wisconsin–Madison alumni
Novelists from New Jersey
20th-century American writers
20th-century American women writers
1953 births